Risto Mattila (15 August 1909 – 3 March 1990) was a Finnish sprinter. He competed in the men's 100 metres at the 1928 Summer Olympics.

References

External links
 

1909 births
1990 deaths
Athletes (track and field) at the 1928 Summer Olympics
Finnish male sprinters
Olympic athletes of Finland
Place of birth missing